Soe Thu (born Soe Thu Lwin on 30 November 1965) is a Myanmar Academy Award-winning Burmese actor, singer and physician. He has achieved fame and success as an actor and singer. Throughout his career, he has produced 13 music solo albums, and acted in over 200 films.

Early life and education
Soe Thu was born on 30 November 1965 in Taungdwingyi, Burma to parent Khin Maung Lwin, an irrigation engineer, and Khin Thuzar, an attorney. He graduated from the University of Medicine 1, Yangon in 1996.

Career
Soe Thu began his entertainment career when he was recruited by director Ni Win Tun to film Nantha Lu Chein and Pan Bu Chain. He made his break in 1982 with the film Maik Kyway Maik Pyit. In 1984, he released his first music album, Achit Ye Hmattan. He subsequently retired from the entertainment industry, emigrating to the United States in 2001. He works at the MedStar Southern Maryland Hospital Center and MedStar Washington Hospital Center in the United States as a cardiologist. He returned to Myanmar by the end of September 2012 to care for his ailing mother. Since then, he performed 3 solo shows in Yangon and Mandalay. From 1983 to present, he has starred in over 200 films.

Personal life

Soe Thu was previously married to Khin Mya Mya Wutt Hmone Swe, with whom he has a daughter, Angel Soe Lwin. He has been dating actress Soe Myat Nandar since 22 May 2013.

Discography

() (1986)
() (1987)
() (1990)
()(1991)
() (1992)
() (1993)
() (1994)
() (1995)
() (1995)
() (1995)
() (1998)
() (2000)
() (2001)
() (2015)

Filmography

Over 200 films, including
Maik Kyway Maik Pyit (1983)

References

20th-century Burmese male singers
21st-century Burmese male singers
Living people
Burmese cardiologists
20th-century Burmese male actors
Burmese emigrants to the United States
People from Yangon
1965 births
Burmese male film actors